Drew Johnson is a political commentator who was the founder and first president of the Tennessee Center for Policy Research.

Drew Johnson may also refer to:

Drew Johnson (comics), comic book illustrator (Silver Age (DC Comics), Tartarus (DC Comics), Tomb Raider (comics), Down to Earth (comics)) 
Drew Johnson (broadcaster), former host of SPEED Center

See also
Andrew Johnson (disambiguation)